Henri Atamaniuk (born 28 October 1944) is a French football manager and former player who played as a midfielder.

Career
On 8 November 2013, Atamaniuk was hired as manager of FC Lausanne-Sport by the new technical director of the club, Marco Simone.

References

External links
 
 

1944 births
Living people
French footballers
Association football midfielders
SO Merlebach players
US Forbach players
FC Sochaux-Montbéliard players
RC Lens players
Racing Besançon players
Montpellier HSC players
FC Metz players
Stade Poitevin FC players
Bourges 18 players
French football managers
FC Lausanne-Sport managers